The 2010 Conference USA football season was an NCAA football season played from September 2, 2010, through December 31, 2010.  Conference USA consists of 12 football members separated into 2 divisions: East Carolina, Marshall, Memphis, Southern Miss, UAB, and UCF make up the eastern division, while Houston, Rice, SMU, Tulane, Tulsa, and UTEP comprise the western division.

This was the 15th football season and 16th overall for Conference USA. Although C-USA was founded in 1995, it did not start football competition until 1996.

Previous season

East Carolina won the 2009 conference championship for the second straight year defeating the #21 Houston Cougars 38-32.

Preseason

Coaching changes
 Ruffin McNeil replaced Skip Holtz at East Carolina.
 Doc Holliday replaced Mark Snyder at Marshall.

Preseason polls
No Conference USA teams were ranked though both SMU and UCF each received one vote.  Houston received 66 points in the AP Poll, and 76 points in the Coaches' Poll.

Regular season

Week One

Week Two

Week Three

Week Four

Week Five

Week Six

Week Seven

Week Eight

Week Nine

Week Ten

Week Eleven

Week Twelve

Week Thirteen

Week Fourteen- C-USA Championship Game

Players of the week

Rankings

Records against other conferences

Bowl games

Bowl Eligibility

Bowl Eligible (6)
UCF (9-3) became bowl eligible on October 30 after defeating East Carolina.
Southern Miss (8-4) became bowl eligible on November 6 after defeating Tulane.
Tulsa (9-3) became bowl eligible on November 6 after defeating Rice.
East Carolina (6-6) became bowl eligible on November 11 after defeating UAB.
UTEP (6-6) became bowl eligible on November 13 after defeating SMU.
SMU (7-5) became bowl eligible on November 20 after defeating Marshall.

Bowl Ineligible (6)
Memphis (1-11) lost the ability to become bowl eligible on October 30 after losing to Houston.
Rice (4-8) lost the ability to become bowl eligible on November 6 after losing to Tulsa.
UAB (4-8) lost the ability to become bowl eligible on November 11 after losing to East Carolina.
Marshall (5-7) lost the ability to become bowl eligible on November 20 after losing to SMU.
Tulane (4-8) lost the ability to become bowl eligible on November 20 after losing to UCF.
Houston (5-7) lost the ability to become bowl eligible on November 27 after losing to Texas Tech.

Bowl games

Attendance

References